Carl Gottlieb Svarez, originally Schwartz (27 February 1746, Schweidnitz - 14 May 1798, Berlin) was a Prussian jurist and reformer who worked on the Landrecht.

Bibliography 
 Adolf Stölzel, Carl Gottlieb Svarez, Berlin 1885
 Ausgewählte Literaturnachweise aus dem Bestand der Akademiebibliothek. Karl Gottlieb Svarez, Jurist  Writings by and about Svarez, Berlin-Brandenburgischen Akademie der Wissenaschaften, 2002 (pdf)

18th-century German lawyers
People from Świdnica
1746 births
1798 deaths
Members of the Prussian Academy of Sciences
18th-century jurists